Eupithecia pyreneata is a moth in the family Geometridae. It is found in southern and central Europe.

The wingspan is 17–18 mm. There usually is one generation with adults on wing from June to July. In southern Europe, a partial second generation may occur.

The larvae fee don Digitalis lutea and Digitalis grandiflora. Larvae can be found from the end of June to August. The species overwinters in the pupal stage.

Subspecies
Eupithecia pyreneata pyreneata
Eupithecia pyreneata granadensis Bubacek, 1926

References

Moths described in 1871
pyreneata
Moths of Europe
Taxa named by Paul Mabille